This is a non-exhaustive list of some American socialites, from before the Gilded Age to the end of the 20th century, who married into the European titled nobility, peerage, or royalty. The titles in this list are all mentioned or translated into English.

Before 1865
 Elizabeth Barbé-Marbois, Marquise de Barbé-Marbois [1817] (née Elizabeth Moore) on 17 June 1784
 Gertrude Buller, Lady Buller [1808] (née Gertrude Van Cortlandt) on 15 May 1790
 Martha Hottinguer, Baroness Hottinguer [1810] (née Martha Eliza Redwood) on 24 August 1793
 The Hon. Mrs Robert Kennedy (née Jane Macomb) on 22 March 1794
 Doña Sarah McKean Armitage de Martínez de Irujo Tacón, Marquise de Casa Irujo [1803] (née Sarah McKean) on 10 April 1798
Ann Baring, Baroness Ashburton (née Ann Louisa Bingham) on 23 August 1798 
 Maria de Tilly, Countess de Tilly (née Maria Matilda Bingham, younger sister of Ann Bingham) on 11 April 1799, later Maria du Blaisel, Marquise du Blaisel (previously Maria Baring) on 17 April 1826
 Louisa Hervey-Bathurst, Lady Hervey-Bathurst [1818] (née Louisa Catherine Caton) on 24 April 1817, later Louisa D'Arcy-Osborne, Duchess of Leeds on 24 April 1828
 Eliza, Countess von Rumpff (née Eliza Astor) on 25 October 1825
 Marianne Wellesley, Marchioness Wellesley (née Marianne Caton, previously Marianne Patterson, elder sister of Louisa Caton) on 29 October 1825
 Catherine Murat, Princess Murat and Princess of Naples (née Catherine Daingerfield Willis, previously Gray) on 12 July 1826
 Jane Lampson, Lady Lampson (née Jane Walter Sibley) in 1827
 Caroline Murat, Princess Murat and Princess of Pontecorvo (née Caroline Georgina Fraser) on 18 August 1831
 Baroness Camille de Varaigne (née Mary Jauncey Thorne) on 28 March 1832
 Elizabeth Stafford-Jerningham, Baroness Stafford (née Elizabeth Caton, younger sister of Marianne Caton) on 26 May 1836
 Baroness Paul Daniel Gonzalve Grand d'Hauteville (née Ellen Sears) on 22 August 1837
 Jane de Pierres, Baroness de Pierres (née Jane Mary Thorne, sister of Mary Thorne) on 7 June 1842
 Adeline de La Valette, Marquise de La Valette (née Adeline Fowle, previously Welles) in 1842
 Countess Amédée d'Audebert de Férussac (née Alice Adele Thorne, younger sister of Mary and Jane Thorne) on 27 August 1845
Countess Ferdinand de Lasteyrie (née Martha Washington Seabrook) on 30 May 1846
 Countess Konstantin von Buxhoeveden (née Caroline McKnight) in 1847
 Mary Cunard, Lady Cunard (née Mary Bache McEvers) in May 1849
 Mary Blanc, Baroness Blanc (née Mary Elizabeth Gebhard) on 29 April 1852
 Baroness Bernhard von Beust (née Sidonie Peters) in 1853
 Baroness August von Waechter-Lautenbach (née Josephine Lee, elder sister of Mary Esther Lee) on 19 December 1855
 Mary Dubois, Viscountess de Courval (née Mary Ray) on 2 July 1856
 Baroness Ancelis de Vaugrigneuse (née Sarah Morris Stout) on 7 October 1857
 Mary Fairfax, Lady Fairfax of Cameron (née Mary Brown Kirby) on 8 October 1857
 Emily de Ganay, Marquise de Ganay (née Emily Ridgway) on 8 March 1858
 Baroness Theodorus van Limburg (née Isabella "Belle" Cass) on 23 August 1858
 Florence Eardley, Lady Eardley (née Emily Florence Magee) on 12 December 1859
 Countess Harald Theodor Karl Gregor Moltke-Hvitfeldt (née Annie Hutton) in 1860
 Countess Paul de Cadoine de Gabriac (née Florence Phalen) on 23 May 1861
 Princess Felix of Salm-Salm (née Agnes Elisabeth Winona Leclerc Joy) on 30 August 1862
 Countess Paul von Hatzfeldt zu Wildenburg (née Helene Moulton) on 4 November 1863
 Helen Scarlett, Baroness Abinger (née Helen Magruder) on 23 December 1863
 Matilda Burnett, Lady Burnett (née Matilda Josephine Murphy) on 23 May 1864
 Mathilde d'Erlanger, Baroness d'Erlanger (née Marguerite Mathilde Slidell) on 3 October 1864
 Princess Frederick of Schleswig-Holstein-Sonderburg-Augustenburg, Princess of Noer (née Mary Esther Lee) on 3 November 1864, later Countess Alfred von Waldersee on 14 April 1874
Countess Carl Gustaf von Rosen (née Ella Carlton Moore) on 10 November 1864

From 1865 to 1965
After the beginning of the Reconstruction Era and the Gilded Age (at the end of the American Civil War on 9 May 1865):

The Hon. Mrs Ralph Harbord (née Elizabeth Pole Schenley) on 5 September 1865
Mary Virginia de Giverville, Countess of Giverville (née Mary Virginia Kingsbury) on 26 October 1865
Countess Charles-Aimery de Narbonne-Lara (née Catherine "Kate" Phalen) on 11 January 1866
Mathilde Lante Montefeltro della Rovere, Duchess di Bomarzo and Princess di Belmonte (née Mathilde "Tilly" Davis) on 28 April 1866 
Elizabeth de Talleyrand-Périgord, Marquise de Talleyrand (née Elizabeth Beers-Curtis) on 18 March 1867
Anna Perrelli Tomacelli Filomarino, Princess di Boiano and Duchess di Monasterace (née Nina "Anna" Christina Haight) on 30 April 1868
Melissa Reade, Lady Reade (née Melissa Ray) on 4 June 1868
Elise, Countess of Edla (née Elise "Elisa" Friedericke Hensler) on 10 June 1869
Mary Elizabeth Brancaccio, Princess Brancaccio, Princess di Triggiano and Duchess di Lustra (née Mary Elizabeth Hickson Field) on 3 March 1870
Romaine, Baroness von Overbeck (née Romaine Madeleine Goddard) on 16 March 1870
Countess Maximilian Ernst Maria Esterházy zu Galántha und Forchtenstein (née Sarah Virginia Carroll, previously Griffin) on 6 June 1870
Eleanor Cenci, Princess di Vicovaro  (née Eleanor Spencer) on 25 June 1870
Princess Alexander zu Lynar (née May Parsons) on 10 May 1871
Countess Alfons de Diesbach (née Meta McCall) on 19 September 1871
Juliet Carington, Lady Carington (née Juliet Warden) on 23 September 1871
The Hon. Mrs Henry Wodehouse on 25 June 1872, then Mary Paget, Marchioness of Anglesey and Countess of Uxbridge on 26 June 1880 (née Mary "Minna" Livingstone King) 
Marie de Grasse Evans, Lady Evans (née Marie de Grasse Stevens, previously Van Wart) on 31 July 1872
Constance Gianotti, Countess Gianotti (née Constance Elizabeth Kinney) on 21 August 1872
Marie Rosine de Serre, Countess de Saint-Roman (née Marie Rosine Slidell) on 30 September 1872
Countess Hans Lothar von Schweinitz (née Anna Jay) on 18 October 1872
Baroness Frédéric Grand d'Hauteville (née Susan Watts Macomb) in 1872
Baroness Adolph von Roques (née Caroline Holbrook, previously Du Barry) in 1872
Augusta Pellew, Viscountess Exmouth (née Augusta Jay) on 14 May 1873
Lady Randolph Spencer-Churchill (née Jennie Jerome, aka  in Europe) on 15 April 1874
Eliza Graham, Lady Graham of Esk (née Elizabeth "Eliza" Jane Burns) on 1 August 1874
Baroness Carl Nils Daniel de Bildt (née Lilian Augusta "Angelika" Stuart Moore) on 30 September 1874
Mary Elizabeth de Choiseul-Praslin, Duchess de Praslin (née Mary Elizabeth "Nellie" Forbes) on 17 December 1874
Marquise Simone Peruzzi de' Medici (née Edith Marion Story) on 9 February 1875
Alice Chapelle de Jumilhac, Duchess de Richelieu on 27 February 1875, then The Princess of Monaco on 30 October 1889 (née Alice Heine)
Sarita Le Peletier, Countess d'Aunay (née Sarita Kimball Berdan) on 3 March 1875
Margaret, Lady de Stuers on 20 April 1875, then Countess Eliot Zborowski, Countess de Montsaulnin on 7 March 1892 (née Margaret Laura Astor Carey)
Jane Molesworth, Lady Molesworth (née Jane Graham Frost) on 3 June 1875
Consuelo Montagu, Duchess of Manchester (née María Francisca de la Consolación "Consuelo" Yznaga) on 22 May 1876
Elizabeth Harcourt, Lady Harcourt (née Elizabeth Cabot Motley, previously Ives) on 2 December 1876
Countess Eberhard von Linden (née Isabella Andrews) on 2 December 1876
The Hon. Mrs Thomas George Grosvenor (née Sophia Williams) on 24 April 1877
Marquise Manfredi Lanza di Mercato Bianco (née Clara Hammond, aka Clara Lanza) on 10 May 1877
Countess Goffredo Guglielmo Galli (née Clara Roberts) on 9 June 1877
Caroline Caldeira Leitão Pinto de Albuquerque, Countess da Borralha (née Caroline Hildegarde Orne) on 12 September 1877
Antoinette Charette de La Contrie, Baroness de Charette (née Antoinette Van Leer Polk) on 1 December 1877
Mary Paget, Lady Paget (née Mary "Minnie" Fiske Stevens) on 27 July 1878
Edith Playfair, Baroness Playfair [1892] (née Edith Russell) on 3 October 1878
The Hon. Mrs Octavius Henry Lambart (née Hannah Sarah Howard) on 15 October 1878
Isabella Eugénie Reubsaet, Duchess di Camposelice [1881] (née Isabella Eugénie Boyer, previously Singer) on 8 January 1879
Ada Telfener, Countess Telfener (née Ada Hungerford) on 15 March 1879 
Mary Cary, Viscountess Falkland (née Mary Reade) on 25 September 1879
Katharine Norton, Baroness Grantley (née Katharine Buckner McVickar, previously Norton) on 5 November 1879
Ellen Magawly Cerati, Countess Magawly di Calry (née Ellen Falkenburg Abbott) on 12 August 1880
The Hon. Mrs James Roche (née Frances Ellen Work) on 22 September 1880
Maria Anna Lobo da Silveira, Marquise de Alvito and Countess de Oriola (née Maria Anna Christ, previously Berna) on 18 December 1880
Florence Fermor-Hesketh, Lady Fermor-Hesketh (née Florence Emily Sharon) on 22 December 1880
Natica Lister-Kaye, Lady Lister-Kaye (née María de la Natividad "Natica" Yznaga) on 5 December 1881
Kate Perceval, Countess of Egmont (née Kate Howell) in 1881
Medora Manca-Amat de Vallombrosa, Marquise de Morès et de Montemaggiore (née Medora Marie von Hoffmann) on 15 February 1882
Margaret Waterlow, Lady Waterlow (née Margaret Hamilton) on 28 March 1882
Baroness Edmund Wucherer von Huldenfeld (née Margaret Plater Price) on 20 July 1882
Baroness Gábor Bornemisza de Kászon et Impérfalva (née Mathilde Louise Price) on 16 May 1883
The Hon. Mrs Hugh Oliver Northcote (née Edith Fish) on 6 June 1883
Anita Wolseley, Lady Wolseley (née Anita Theresa Murphy) on 17 July 1883
Julia Paget, Lady Paget (née Julia Norrie Moke) on 19 July 1883
Leonie Leslie, Lady Leslie (née Leonie Blanche Jerome) on 2 October 1884
The Hon. Mrs Charles Maule Ramsay (née Martha Estelle Garrison) on 28 May 1885
Josephine Ruspoli, Princess di Poggio Suasa (née Josephine Mary Beers-Curtis) on 18 June 1885
Daisy Balluet d'Estournelles de Constant, Baroness de Constant de Rebecque (née Margaret "Daisy" Sedgwick Berend) on 25 June 1885
Frances Venables-Vernon, Baroness Vernon (née Frances Margaret Lawrance) on 14 July 1885
Tennessee Cook, Lady Cook and Viscountess de Monserrate (née Tennessee Celeste Claflin) on 15 October 1885
Marquise Carlo Vetti Torrigiani (née Nancy McClellan Fry) in 1885
Norma de Suarez d'Aulan, Marquise d'Aulan (née Norma Christmas) on 17 March 1886
Baroness Louis de La Grange (née Anita Maria Carroll) on 14 October 1886
Countess Jean de Kergorlay (née Mary Louisa Carroll) on 3 December 1886
The Hon. Mrs Walter Yarde-Buller (née Leilah Kirkham, previously Blair) in 1886
Adele de Talleyrand-Périgord, Duchess of Dino (née Adele Livingston Sampson, previously Stevens) on 25 January 1887
Ellen Butler, Marchioness of Ormonde (née Ellen Sprague Stager) on 8 March 1887
Princess Louis de Scey-Montbéliard on 27 July 1887, then Princess Edmond de Polignac on 15 December 1893 (née Winnaretta Eugenie Singer)
Countess Detalmo Savorgnan di Brazzà (née Cora Ann Slocomb) on 18 October 1887
Baroness Ludovic Moncheur (née Mary Daisy Holman) on 26 October 1887
Laura Haldane-Duncan, Countess of Camperdown (née Laura Dove, previously Blanchard) on 4 February 1888
Marquise Paolo d'Adda Salvaterra on 7 February 1888, then Countess Horace de Choiseul-Praslin on 25 May 1906 (née Mary Hooper)
Isabelle-Blanche Decazes de Glücksbierg, Duchess Decazes and Duchess af Glücksbierg (née Isabelle Blanche Singer) on 28 April 1888 
Louisa Walpole, Countess of Orford (née Louisa Melissa Corbin) on 17 May 1888
Lily Spencer-Churchill, Duchess of Marlborough on 29 June 1888, then Lady William Beresford on 30 April 1895 (née Jane Lilian "Lily" Warren Price, previously Hamersley)
Leila Herbert, Lady Herbert (née Leila "Belle" Wilson) on 27 November 1888
Helen Duncan, Lady Duncan (née Helen Julia Pfizer) in 1888
Doña María Luisa La Farge Binsse de Saint-Victor de Ágreda May, Countess de Casa de Ágreda (née Marie Louise La Farge, previously Lorillard, aka Countess de Agreda) on 4 February 1889
Elizabeth Smith-Barry, Baroness Barrymore (née Elizabeth Wadsworth, previously Post) on 28 February 1889
Jeanie Naylor-Leyland, Lady Naylor-Leyland (née Jeanie Willson Chamberlain) on 14 September 1889
Princess Franz von Hatzfeldt zu Wildenburg (née Clara Elizabeth Prentice-Huntington) on 28 October 1889
Caroline Fitzmaurice, Baroness Fitzmaurice (née Caroline Fitzgerald) on 23 November 1889
Sarah, Baroness Halkett (née Sarah Maria Phelps Stokes) on 11 February 1890
Countess Maximilian Albrecht zu Pappenheim (née Mary Wister Wheeler) on 29 April 1890
Josephine Boyle, Countess of Cork and Orrery (née Josephine Catherine Hale) on 30 April 1890
Clara de Riquet, Princess de Caraman-Chimay (née Clara Ward) on 19 May 1890
Baroness Moritz Curt von Zedtwitz (née Mary Elizabeth "Lina" Breckinridge Caldwell) in June 1890
Countess Charles de Galliffet on 15 November 1890, then Countess Maurice des Monstiers de Mérinville on 28 July 1914 (née Frances Stevens) 
Helene Leigh, Baroness Leigh (née Frances Helene Forbes Beckwith) on 29 November 1890 
Princess Friedrich Wilhelm von Ardeck, Princess von Ardeck on 17 December 1890, then Baroness József Döry de Jobaháza on 4 February 1904 (née Anne Hollingsworth Price)
Marcelite Le Tonnelier, Marquise de Breteuil (née Marcelite "Lita" Garner) on 3 March 1891
Countess Hermann Alexander de Pourtalès (née Helen "Hélène" Barbey) on 25 April 1891
Florence Gordon-Cumming, Lady Gordon-Cumming (née Florence Garner) on 10 June 1891
Mary Gough-Calthorpe, Baroness Calthorpe (née Mary Burrows) on 22 July 1891
Baroness Maximilian von Berg (née Sallie Mae Price) on 22 October 1891
Countess Micislas Orlowski (née Mabel Ledyard Stevens) on 28 December 1891
Emma Seillière, Baroness Seillière (née Emma Riley, previously Livermore) on 22 April 1892
Countess Johannes von Francken-Sierstorpff (née Mary Carpenter Knowlton) on 27 April 1892
The Hon. Mrs Francis Anson (née Caroline Cleveland) on 15 June 1892
Elizabeth Eaton, Baroness Cheylesmore (née Elizabeth Richardson French) on 14 July 1892
Amy Home-Speirs, Lady Home (née Amy Eliza Green) on 30 August 1892
Antoinette Vanden-Bempde-Johnstone, Lady Vanden-Bempde-Johnstone (née Antoinette Pinchot) on 21 December 1892
Mary Caroline Grey-Egerton, Lady Grey-Egerton (née Mary Caroline "May" Campbell Cuyler) on 4 January 1893
Cornelia Craven, Countess of Craven (née Cornelia Martin) on 18 April 1893
Flora Hamilton-Temple-Blackwood, Marchioness of Dufferin and Ava on 16 October 1893, then Flora Curzon, Countess Howe in December 1919 (née Florence "Flora" Hamilton Davis) 
Adele Capell, Countess of Essex (née Adele Beach Grant) on 14 December 1893
Virginia Coventry, Viscountess Deerhurst (née Virginia Lee Daniel, aka Virginia Bonynge) on 10 March 1894
Countess Georg Erdődy de Monyorókerék et Monoszló (née Julia Scott) on 30 April 1894
Elizabeth Poniatowski, Princess Poniatowski, Princess di Monte Rotondo (née Elizabeth Helen Sperry) on 6 October 1894
Princess Sergei Belosselsky-Belozersky (née Susan Tucker Whittier) on 23 October 1894
Lady Francis Pelham-Clinton-Hope (née Mary Augusta "May" Yohé, aka  in Europe) on 27 November 1894
The Hon. Mrs Bertrand Russell (née Alys Whitall Pearsall Smith) on 13 December 1894
Countess Boni de Castellane on 4 March 1895, then Anna de Talleyrand-Périgord, Duchess de Sagan on 7 July 1908 (née Anna Gould)
Maud Cunard, Lady Cunard (née Maud Alice Burke) on 18 April 1895
Mary Curzon, Marchioness Curzon of Kedleston, Vicereine of India (née Mary Victoria Leiter) on 22 April 1895
Lady Sholto George Douglas (née Loretta Mooney, aka Loretta Addis) on 31 May 1895
Leonora Bennet, Countess of Tankerville (née Leonora Sophia Van Marter) on 23 October 1895
Countess Maximilien de Foras (née Marie Delphine Meredith Read) on 5 November 1895
Consuelo Spencer-Churchill, Duchess of Marlborough (née Consuelo Vanderbilt) on 6 November 1895
Cara Broughton, Baroness Fairhaven (née Cara Leland Rogers, previously Duff) on 12 November 1895
Margaret Pineton de Chambrun, Marquise de Chambrun (née Margaret Rives Nichols) on 12 December 1895
Countess Béla Mária Rudolf Zichy de Zich et Vásonkeő (née Mabel Elizabeth Wright, previously Yznaga) on 26 December 1895
Amy Parker, Lady Parker [1902] (née Amy VanTine) in December 1895
Princess Pierre Troubetzkoy (née Amélie Louise Rives, previously Chanler) on 18 February 1896
Countess Conrad de Buisseret Steenbecque de Blarenghien (née Caroline Sherman Story) on 17 August 1896
Mary Gwendolin des Montiers-Mérinville, Marquise des Monstiers-Mérinville (née Mary Gwendolin "Mamie" Byrd Caldwell) on 19 October 1896
Viscountess Léon Frédéric de Janzé (née Marguerite "Moya" Hennessy) on 11 January 1897
Baroness Clemens August von Ketteler (née Matilda "Maud" Cass Ledyard) on 24 February 1897
Countess Manfred von Matuschka (née  Helen "Ella" Holbrook Walker) on 16 June 1897, then Princess della Torre e Tasso and Duchess of Castel Duino (previously Hyde) in May 1932
Countess Arthur de Gabriac (née Fanny Fithian) on 27 October 1897
Cora Byng, Countess of Strafford (née Cora Smith, previously Colgate) on 6 December 1898
Baroness Adolf Johann von Brüning (née Marion "Maria" Hubbard Treat, previously McKay, aka Countess Maria von Bruening) on 18 April 1899
Princess Franz Seraph Maria Joseph Nepomuk von Auersperg (née Florence Elsworth Hazard) on 14 June 1899
Mary Harcourt, Viscountess Harcourt (née Mary Ethel Burns) on 1 July 1899
Princess Mikhail Cantacuzène, Countess Speransky (née Julia Dent Grant) on 24 September 1899
Pauline, Baroness von Bush (née Clara Pauline Joran, aka Baroness de Bush) on 6 December 1899
The Hon. Mrs Charles John Coventry (née Lily Whitehouse) on 16 January 1900
Marian Hottinguer, Baroness Hottinguer (née Marian Hall Munroe) on 23 January 1900
The Hon. Mrs Archibald Lionel Lindesay-Bethune (née Ethel Tucker) on 31 January 1900
Edith Vessicchio, Countess di Castelmenardo (née Edith Marie Van Buren, aka Countess de Castelmenardo) on 7 July 1900
Helena Montagu, Duchess of Manchester on 14 November 1900, then Helena Keith-Falconer, Countess of Kintore on 23 November 1937 (née Helena Zimmerman) 
Gertrude Forbes-Robertson, Lady Forbes-Robertson [1913] (née May Gertrude Dermot, aka Gertrude Elliott) in 1900
Countess Aldebert de Chambrun (née Clara Eleanor Longworth) on 19 February 1901
Ethel Beatty, Countess Beatty [1919] (née Ethel Newcomb Field, previously Tree) on 22 May 1901
The Hon. Mrs William Arthur de la Poer Horsley-Beresford (née Florence Miller) on 17 June 1901
Countess Franz-Joseph Larisch von Moennich (née Mary "Marie" Satterfield) on 27 June 1901
Maria Rospigliosi, Princess Rospigliosi and Duchess di Zagarolo (née Marie "Maria" Jennings Reid, previously Parkhurst) on 26 August 1901
Countess Boson de Talleyrand-Périgord, Duchess de Valençay  (née Helen Stuyvesant Morton) on 5 October 1901
Elena Hely-Hutchinson, Countess of Donoughmore (née Elena Maria Grace) on 21 December 1901
Patricia Lockhart-Ross, Lady Lockhart-Ross (née Patricia Burnley Ellison) in 1901
Baroness Ludovic Moncheur (née Charlotte "Carlota" Clayton) on 15 January 1902
Wilhelmina Burrell, Lady Burrell (née Wilhelmina Louisa Winans) on 11 February 1902
Countess Hugo von und zu Lerchenfeld auf Köfering und Schönberg (née Ethel Louise Wyman) on 24 September 1902
Countess Paul Raoul de Sauvan d'Aramon (née Henrietta "Rita" Bell) on 24 September 1902
The Hon. Mrs Walter Patrick Lindsay (née Ruth Henderson) on 26 November 1902
The Hon. Mrs Cecil Baring (née Maude Louise Lorillard, previously Tailer) in November 1902
Baroness André Poupart de Neuflize (née Eveline "Eva" Barbey) on 10 February 1903
Alice Seymour, Countess of Yarmouth (née Alice Cornelia Thaw) on 27 April 1903
Harriet della Gherardesca, Countess della Gherardesca (née Harriet Richmond Taylor) on 20 May 1903
Romaine Monson, Baroness Monson (née Romaine Stone, previously Turnure) on 1 July 1903
Baroness Constantin Johan Edvard Axel Ramsay (née Frances Whitehouse) on 7 July 1903
Lilian Bagot, Baroness Bagot (née Lilian Marie May) on 25 July 1903
Mary Innes-Ker, Duchess of Roxburghe (née Mary "May" Goelet) on 10 November 1903
Countess Riccardo Fabbricotti (née Cornelia Roosevelt Scovel) on 25 November 1903
Countess Odon de Lubersac (née Constance Livermore, aka Constance Livermore-Seillière) on 26 January 1904
Countess Alexander von Beroldingen (née Margaret Stone) on 3 February 1904
Countess Josef Gizycki (née Eleanor Josephine Medill "Cissy" Patterson) on 14 April 1904
Countess Louis de Gontaut-Biron (née Martha "Marthe" Leishman) on 27 June 1904
Countess Gaston de Breteuil (née Edythe Scott Grant) on 18 July 1904
Marion Bateman-Hanbury, Baroness Bateman (née Marion Alice Graham, previously Knapp) on 23 July 1904
Baroness Reinhart Bachofen von Echt (née Alice Pfizer) on 5 September 1904  
Countess Camille de Borchgrave d'Altena (née Ruth Reilly Snyder) on 22 September 1904
Edith Dusmet de Smours, Marquise Dusmet de Smours (née Edith Oliver) on 22 October 1904
Margaret Howard, Countess of Suffolk (née Margaret "Daisy" Hyde Leiter) on 26 December 1904
Alice Lowther, Lady Lowther (née Alice Blight) on 28 February 1905
Anna St Clair-Erskine, Countess of Rosslyn (née Anna Robinson) on 21 March 1905
Beatrice de Galard de Béarn, Princess de Béarn et de Chalais (née Beatrice Winans) on 24 June 1905
The Hon. Mrs Frederick Edward Guest (née Amy Phipps) on 28 June 1905
The Hon. Mrs Lionel George William Guest (née Flora Bigelow, previously Dodge) on 6 July 1905
Alberta Montagu, Countess of Sandwich (née Alberta Sturges) on 25 July 1905
The Hon. Mrs Alexander FitzRoy St Clair-Erskine (née Winifrede Baker) on 28 October 1905
Eloise Heathcote-Drummond-Willoughby, Countess of Ancaster (née Eloise Lawrence Breese) on 6 December 1905
Frances Baring, Baroness Ashburton (née Frances Donnelly, aka Frances Belmont) on 19 February 1906
Nancy Astor, Viscountess Astor (née Nancy Witcher Langhorne, previously Shaw) on 3 May 1906
The Hon. Mrs Lionel John Olive Lambart (née Adelaide Douglas Randolph) on 8 May 1906
Mary Falle, Baroness Portsea (née Mary Greene Hubbard Sturgis, previously Seymour) on 18 July 1906
Isabella Geddes, Baroness Geddes [1942] (née Isabella Gamble Ross) on 8 September 1906
Clara Green-Price, Lady Green-Price (née Clara Lucile Potter) on 24 November 1906
The Hon. Mrs Murrough O'Brien (née Marguerite Lewis) on 21 November 1906
Hermione Law, Baroness Ellenborough (née Hermione Octavia Croghan Schenley) on 19 December 1906
Madeleine d'Andigné, Marquise d'Andigné (née Madeleine Ives Goddard) on 29 December 1906
Countess Carl Poul Oscar Moltke (née Cornelia Van Rensselaer Thayer) on 29 June 1907
Baroness Maximilian Konrad von Romberg (née Antoinette MacDonough Converse) in July 1907
Mary Elsie Torlonia, Princess di Civitella-Cesi (née Mary Elsie Moore) on 15 August 1907
Lady Alastair Robert Innes-Ker (née Anne Breese) on 10 October 1907 
Amy Harrington, Lady Harrington (née Amy McMillan) on 13 October 1907 
The Hon. Mrs Henry Thomas Coventry (née Edith Kip, previously McCreery) on 3 December 1907
Baroness Leo de Graffenried (née Irma Stern) on 10 December 1907
Countess László Széchenyi de Sárvár-Felsővidék (née Gladys Moore Vanderbilt) on 27 January 1908
Florence Grosvenor, Baroness Ebury (née Florence Padelford) on 1 February 1908
Theodora d'Albert, Duchess de Chaulnes (née Theodora Mary Shonts) on 16 February 1908
Countess Rudolph Festetics de Tolna (née Alice Ney Wetherbee) on 24 February 1908
Baroness Johann Friedrich von Hiller (née Emily Bronaugh Barney) on 6 June 1908
Jean Ward, Lady Ward (née Jean Templeton Reid) on 23 June 1908
Elizabeth de Queirós de Almeida e Vasconcelos, Countess de Santa Eulalia (née Sarah Elizabeth Shindler, previously Stetson) on 23 July 1908
Baroness Curt Loeffelholz von Colberg (née Ione "Iona" Wilhelmina Sutton Pickhardt, previously Shope) in 1908
Beatrice Forbes, Countess of Granard (née Beatrice Mills) on 14 January 1909
Countess Hermann von Seherr-Thoss (née Margaret Muriel White) on 29 April 1909
Josephine del Drago dei Principi del Drago, Marquise di Riofreddo (née Josephine Kleiner, previously Schmid, aka Princess del Drago) on 22 May 1909
Beatrice Theodoli, Marquise Theodoli di San Vito (née Beatrice Thaw) on 4 June 1909
Hazel Lavery, Lady Lavery [1918] (née Hazel Martyn, previously Trudeau) on 21 July 1909
Florence Fermor-Hesketh, Baroness Hesketh (née Florence Louise Breckinridge) on 9 September 1909
Princess Miguel of Braganza (née Anita Rhinelander Stewart) on 15 September 1909
Susanne Charette de La Contrie, Marquise de Charette and Baroness de La Contrie (née Susanne Henning) on 11 November 1909
Olive Greville, Baroness Greville (née Olive Grace, previously Kerr) on 24 November 1909 
Irene, Viscountess de Beughem de Houtem (née Irone "Irene" Hare) on 5 December 1909
Ellen Hood, Lady Hood (née Ellen Touzalin, previously Nickerson) on 19 January 1910
Countess Antal Sigray (née Harriot Holmes "Hattie" Daly) on 29 March 1910
Baroness Ferdinand Carl von Stumm (née Constance Hoyt) on 30 March 1910
Margaretta Finch-Hatton, Countess of Winchilsea and Nottingham (née Margaretta Armstrong Drexel) on 8 June 1910
Mildred Acheson, Countess of Gosford (née Caroline Mildred Carter) on 21 June 1910
Helen Eliot, Countess of St Germans (née Helen Agnes Post) on 22 June 1910
Princess Albrecht Radziwiłł (née Dorothy Evelyn "Dolly" Deacon) on 5 July 1910
Countess Pierre-Joseph de Salviac de Viel-Castel (née Annah Dillon Ripley) on 15 October 1910
Jane Vavasseur Fisher, Baroness Fisher (née Jane Morgan) on 22 November 1910
Lucie de Choiseul-Praslin, Duchess de Praslin (née Lucie Marie Tate, previously Paine) on 28 November 1910
Alys Bingham, Lady Bingham (née Alys Elizabeth Carr, previously Chauncey) on 3 February 1911
Helen Beresford, Baroness Decies (née Helen Vivien Gould) on 7 February 1911
Lady George Hugo Cholmondeley (née Clara Elizabeth Taylor, previously Stirling) on 7 March 1911
Duchess Henry Borwin zu Mecklenburg (née Elizabeth Tibbits Pratt, previously De Gasquet-James) on 15 June 1911
Princess Victor von Thurn und Taxis (née Lida Eleanor Nicolls, previously Fitzgerald) on 1 November 1911
Mildred Stonor, Baroness Camoys (née Mildred Constance Sherman) on 25 November 1911
Baroness Hardouin de Reinach-Werth (née Diana Morgan Hill) on 6 December 1911
Marguerite Caetani, Princess di Bassiano and Duchess di Sermoneta (née Marguerite Chapin) in 1911
Countess Anton Apponyi de Nagy-Appony (née Kate "Kitty" Nelke) on 3 June 1912
The Hon. Mrs Alfred Anson (née Lela Amelia Alexander, previously Emery) on 1 July 1912
Antoinette Brett, Viscountess Esher (née Antoinette Heckscher) on 1 October 1912
Constance de Lasteyrie du Saillant, Marquise de Lasteyrie du Saillant (née Constance Whitney Warren) on 19 December 1912
Margaret Vanneck, Baroness Huntingfield (née Margaret Eleanor Crosby) on 21 December 1912 
Princess Michel Murat (née Helena McDonald Stallo) on 6 February 1913
Elinor Chapelle de Jumilhac, Duchess de Richelieu (née Elinor Douglas Wise) on 8 February 1913
Princess Daria Karageorgevich (née Myra Abigail "Abbie" Pankhurst, previously Pratt) on 11 June 1913
Princess Aymon de Faucigny-Lucinge (née Carolyn Salome Foster, previously Stickney) on 2 July 1913
Nancy, Duchess of Croÿ (née Nancy Louise Leishman) on 24 October 1913
 Countess Paul Cornet de Ways-Ruart (née Gladys Villiers McMillan) on 18 February 1914
Mae Wellesley, Countess Cowley (née Mae Josephine Callicott, aka Mae Pickard or May Picard) on 23 February 1914
Countess Armand de Jumilhac (née Ethel Lynde Barbey, previously Norrie) on 13 June 1914
Laura Rospigliosi, Princess Rospigliosi (née Laura McDonald Stallo) on 30 June 1914
Countess Gyula Apponyi de Nagy-Appony (née Gladys Virginia Steuart) on 29 July 1914
Julia Greg, Lady Greg (née Julia Fairchild Schreiner) in 1914
Elizabeth, Baroness von Barchfeld (née Elizabeth Reid Rogers) on 14 January 1915
Princess Ludovico Pignatelli d'Aragon (née Ruth Morgan Waters) on 4 May 1915
Nobile Miriam Caracciolo dei Duchi di Melito (née Miriam Terry Crosby, aka Countess Miriam Caracciolo di Melito) on 3 June 1915
Eleanor Methuen, Baroness Methuen (née Eleanor "Norah" Hennessy) on 6 July 1915
Countess Roger de Périgny (née Frances Evelyn "Fannie" Bostwick, previously Francis) on 17 August 1915
Emily de La Grange, Baroness de La Grange (née Emily Eleanor Sloane) on 15 September 1915
Duchess Henry Borwin zu Mecklenburg (née Natalie "Lily" Oelrichs, previously Martin) in 1915
Ida Minotto, Countess Minotto (née Ida May Swift) on 15 January 1916
Countess Fal de Saint-Phalle (née Marie Guidet Abeel Duryee) on 9 May 1916
Grace Sandilands, Lady Torphichen (née Grace Douglass Pierce) on 3 June 1916  
Princess Andrea Boncompagni-Ludovisi-Rondinelli-Vitelli, Marquise di Bucine (née Margaret Preston Draper) on 25 October 1916

Princess Alfred zu Hohenlohe-Waldenburg-Schillingsfürst (née Catherine Britton) on 14 December 1916
Grace Curzon, Marchioness Curzon of Kedleston (née Grace Elvina Hinds, previously Duggan) on 2 January 1917
Princess Houreddin Vlora (née Helen Margaret Kelly, previously Thomas) on 20 June 1917
Peggy Brodrick, Viscountess Dunsford (née Margaret "Peggy" Rush) on 23 June 1917
Eva Gourgaud, Baroness Gourgaud (née Eva Buckingham Gebhard) on 25 September 1917
Baroness Friedrich von und zu Weichs zur Wenne (née Vernal Edna Andrews, aka Fern Andra) on 28 September 1917
Nina de Polignac, Marquise de Polignac (née Nina Floyd Crosby, previously Eustis) on 24 October 1917
Princess Afonso of Braganza (née Nevada Stoody Hayes, previously Van Valkenburgh) on 23 November 1917
Countess André de Limur (née Ethel Mary Crocker) on 27 March 1918
Baroness Alfred de Ropp (née Olivia Pillsbury) on 12 March 1919
Princess Dmitri Golitsyn (née Frances Simpson Stevens) on 19 April 1919
Ava Lister, Baroness Ribblesdale (née Ava Lowle Willing, previously Astor) on 5 June 1919
Countess Mario Panciera di Zoppola (née Edith Mary "Tookie" Mortimer) on 21 June 1919
Baroness Emile de Cartier de Marchienne (née Marie Emery Dow, previously Cary) on 16 July 1919
Countess Eugeniusz Dąmbski on 5 November 1919, then Princess Serge Mdivani on 14 May 1927 (née Apolonia Chałupiec, aka Pola Negri)
Princess Marie-André Poniatowski (née Frances Alice Willing Lawrance) on 27 December 1919
Princess Anastasia of Greece and Denmark (née Nonie "Nancy" May Stewart, previously Leeds) on 1 January 1920
Countess Alexandre de Saint-Phalle (née Helene Georgia Harper) on 6 April 1920
Mary Wallop, Viscountess Lymington (née Mary Lawrence Post) on 31 July 1920
Ruth de Villiers, Viscountess du Terrage (née Ruth King) on 4 November 1920
Eleanor Stuart, Countess Castle Stewart (née Eleanor May Guggenheim) on 16 December 1920
Gladys Spencer-Churchill, Duchess of Marlborough (née Gladys Marie Deacon) on 25 June 1921
Princess Mikhail Cantacuzène, Countess Speransky (née Clarissa Pelham Curtis) on 26 June 1921
Edith Paget, Baroness Queenborough (née Edith Starr Miller) on 19 July 1921
Alice de Janzé, Countess de Janzé (née Alice Silverthorne) on 21 September 1921
Evelyn de Crussol, Duchess de Crussol (née Evelyn Anne Gordon) on 10 October 1921
Countess Paul Pálffy ab Erdöd (née Dorothy Evelyn "Dolly" Deacon, previously Radziwiłł) on 15 January 1922 
Countess Anastasy Vonsyatsky (née Marion Buckingham Ream) on 4 February 1922
Catherine Herbert, Countess of Carnarvon (née Anne Catherine Tredick Wendell) on 17 July 1922
Margaret Dukes, Lady Dukes (née Margaret Stuyvesant Rutherfurd, previously Mills) in October 1922, then Princess Charles Murat on 5 July 1929   
Kathleen Feilding, Countess of Denbigh (née Kathleen Emmet) on 12 February 1923
Gwendolin Edmonstone, Lady Edmonstone (née Gwendolin Marshall Field) on 5 April 1923
Countess Carlo Dentice di Frasso (née Dorothy Caldwell Taylor, previously Grahame-White) on 9 July 1923
Jessica Carnegie, Countess of Northesk (née Jessica Ruth Brown, previously Reinhard) on 19 July 1923
Countess Roger de Périgny (née Margaret Copley Thaw, previously Carnegie) on 12 November 1923
Countess Ludwig von Salm-Hoogstraeten (née Mary Millicent Abigail Rogers) on 8 January 1924
Iris Origo, Marquise di Val d'Orcia (née Iris Margaret Cutting) on 4 March 1924
The Hon. Mrs John Francis Amherst Cecil (née Cornelia Stuyvesant Vanderbilt) on 29 April 1924
Princess Viggo of Schleswig-Holstein-Sonderburg-Glücksburg, Countess af Rosenborg (née Eleanor Margaret Green) on 10 June 1924
Barbara Stuart, Countess of Moray (née Barbara Murray) on 21 June 1924
Elizabeth Lindsay, Lady Lindsay (née Elizabeth Sherman Hoyt) on 14 July 1924
Valérie Pozzo di Borgo, Duchess Pozzo di Borgo (née Valerie "Valérie" Norrie) on 21 July 1924
Princess Obolensky-Neledinsky-Meletzky on 24 July 1924, then Ava Hofmann, Edle von Hofmannsthal on 21 January 1933 (née Ava Alice Muriel Astor)
Countess Pierre de Jumilhac (née Constance Crowninshield Coolidge, previously Atherton) on 11 October 1924
Philippa Stewart, Countess of Galloway (née Philippa Fendall Wendell) on 14 October 1924
Margaret Caracciolo, Princess di Castagneto and Duchess di Melito (née Margaret Clarke) on 8 January 1925
Gloria Le Bailly de La Falaise, Marquise de La Coudraye (née Gloria May Josephine Swanson, previously Somborn) on 28 January 1925
Countess Raoul de Roussy de Sales (née Reine Marie Tracy, previously Stewart) on 5 February 1925
Katherine James, Baroness Northbourne (née Katherine Louise Nickerson) on 4 March 1925
Kay Bourbon del Monte, Princess di San Faustino (née Katherine "Kay" Linn Sage) on 30 March 1925
Baroness Roland de Graffenried de Villars (née Dorothy Gould) on 5 May 1925
Princess Guido Pignatelli (née Constance Grenelle Wilcox) on 28 August 1925
Princess Eduard Josef von Lobkowicz (née Anita Hegeler Lihme, aka Princess Edward Joseph de Lobkowicz) on 29 August 1925
Princess Mstislav Galitzine, Countess Ostermann (née Amy "Aimée" Isabella Crocker, previously Miskinoff) on 22 September 1925
Nobile Marion Dusmet de Smours dei Duchi Dusmet de Smours (née Marion "Polly" Hubbard Powers) on 30 September 1925
Baroness Jean de Lustrac (née Helen Reid) on 24 November 1925
Elsie Mendl, Lady Mendl (née Ella "Elsie" Anderson De Wolfe) on 10 March 1926
Thelma Furness, Viscountess Furness (née Thelma Morgan, previously Converse) on 27 June 1926
Princess David Mdivani (née Marie Adrienne Koenig, aka Mae Murray) on 27 June 1926
Marian Chigi Albani della Rovere, Princess Chigi Albani della Rovere (née Marian Berry) on 16 July 1926
Princess Romanovskaya-Ilyinskaya on 21 November 1926, then Princess Dimitri Djordjadze in March 1937 (née Anna Audrey Emery)
Princess Levan Melikov (née Rosalie Hooker, previously Dixon, aka Princess Melikov de Somhetie) in 1926
Countess Gaston de Galard de Béarn, Countess de Béarn (née Monica Maude Avery) on 25 April 1927
Countess André-Marie de Saint-Phalle (née Jeanne Jacqueline Harper) on 7 June 1927
Doña Margaret Strong Rockefeller de Cuevas Bartholín, Marquise de Piedrablanca de Guana, aka Marquise de Cuevas (née Margaret Rockefeller Strong) on 3 August 1927
Princess Balthazar Gyalma Odescalchi (née Elaine Wilhelmine Daniels Willcox) on 30 September 1927
Baroness Maximilian Edmund von Romberg (née Emily Purdon Hall) on 14 April 1928
Nobile Marie Sommaripa dei Signori di Paro e Andro (née Marie Seton) on 11 August 1928
Countess Paul Pálffy ab Erdöd (née Eleanor Jenckes Roelker, previously Tweed) on 25 August 1928
Princess Charles-Philippe d'Orléans, Duchess of Nemours (née Marguerite Watson) on 24 September 1928
Beatrice Acheson, Countess of Gosford (née Beatrice Claflin, previously Breese) on 1 October 1928
Countess Folke Bernadotte, Countess af Wisborg (née Estelle Romaine Manville) on 1 December 1928
The Hon. Mrs Michael Simon Scott (née Ruth Brady) on 31 December 1928
Princess Heinrich Reuss zu Köstritz (née Allene Tew, previously Burchard) on 10 April 1929, then Countess Pavel Kotzebue on 4 March 1936 
Caroline Nicolis, Countess di Robilant e Cereaglio (née Caroline Kent) on 1 October 1929
Baroness James-Ferdinand Baeyens (née Mary Cecelia "Cecilia" Clark) on 16 October 1929
Genevieve de Janzé, Countess de Janzé (née Genevieve Willinger, previously Ryan) on 9 January 1930
Marion Butler, Countess of Carrick (née Marion Caher Donoghue, previously Edwards) on 14 August 1930, then Marion Cavendish, Baroness Chesham on 20 October 1938
The Hon. Mrs Andrew Nicholas Armstrong Vanneck (née Louise Hollingsworth Morris Clews) on 1 September 1930, then Louise Campbell, Duchess of Argyll on 23 November 1935
Princess Serge Mdivani (née Mamie Harris, aka Mary McCormic, previously Rankin) on 27 April 1931
Princess Johannes von Liechtenstein (née Aleene McFarland) on 29 July 1931
Constance Le Bailly de La Falaise, Marquise de La Coudraye (née Constance Campbell Bennett, previously Plant) on 22 November 1931
Countess Giovanni Guido Carlo Cardelli (née Jacqueline Melanie Stewart) on 23 November 1931
Marian Rospigliosi, Princess Rospigliosi and Duchess di Zagarolo (née Marian Adair Snowden) on 27 November 1931
Renee Carafa, Duchess d'Andria e Castel del Monte (née Renee Thornton, previously Hageman) on 27 January 1932
Katherine Runciman, Viscountess Runciman of Doxford (née Katherine Schuyler Garrison) on 11 April 1932
Lady Charles Cavendish (née Adele Marie Austerlitz, aka Adele Astaire) on 9 May 1932
Elizabeth Prescott, Lady Prescott (née Elizabeth Hughes Melcer) on 12 November 1932
Lillie Apuzzo di Portanova, Baroness di Portanova (née Lillie Cranz Cullen) on 16 December 1932 
Mary Elsie Wellesley, Countess Cowley (née Mary Elsie May, previously Himes) on 18 June 1933
Princess Alexis Mdivani (née Barbara Woolworth Hutton) on 22 June 1933, then Countess Kurt von Haugwitz-Reventlow on 14 May 1935, then Princess Igor Troubetzkoy (previously Grant) on 1 April 1947, then Baroness Gottfried von Cramm (previously Rubirosa) in November 1955
Janet Caravita, Princess di Sirignano (née Janet Elizabeth Snowden) in August 1933
Helen de Goyon, Duchess de Feltre (née Helen Seton) on 21 October 1933
Countess Antoine Sala (née Laura Bache Kayser, previously Bayer) in 1933
Nancy Wyndham-Quin, Countess of Dunraven and Mount-Earl (née Nancy Yuille) on 7 March 1934 
Carroll Tennyson, Baroness Tennyson (née Carroll Elting, previously Donner) on 14 April 1934
Elizabeth de la Poer Beresford, Baroness Decies (née Elizabeth Wharton Drexel, previously Lehr) on 25 May 1936 
Princess Serge Wolkonsky (née Mary Walker Fearn, previously French) on 8 July 1936
Sallie Ponsonby, Baroness Sysonby (née Sallie Whitney Sanford) on 2 October 1936
Geraldine Lindsay-Hogg, Lady Lindsay-Hogg (née Geraldine Mary Fitzgerald) on 18 November 1936
Princess Guido Pignatelli (née Henrietta Guerard Pollitzer, previously Hartford) on 25 April 1937
Wallis Windsor, Duchess of Windsor (née Bessie Wallis Warfield, previously Simpson) on 3 June 1937
Virginia Child-Villiers, Countess of Jersey (née Virginia Cherrill, previously Grant) on 30 July 1937
Rozell Empain, Baroness Empain (née Rozell Rowland) on 4 November 1937
Barbara Petty-Fitzmaurice, Marchioness of Lansdowne (née Barbara Dempsey Chase) on 18 March 1938
Princess Artchil Gourielli-Tchkonia (née Chaya Rubinstein, aka Helena Rubinstein, previously Titus) in June 1938
Lela de Talleyrand-Périgord, Duchess de Talleyrand and Duchess di Dino (née Lela Alexander Emery, previously Mackintosh) on 30 August 1938
Countess Lorenzo Paolozzi (née Alice "Alicia" Orpha Spaulding) on 30 October 1938
Princess Alexis Obolensky (née Jane Wheeler Irby) on 6 January 1939
The Hon. Mrs Cecil Howard (née Frances Dean, aka Frances Drake) on 12 February 1939
Princess Kirill Scherbatoff (née Adelaide Sedgwick, previously Munroe) on 27 April 1939 
Vera Swettenham, Lady Swettenham (née Vera Seton Gordon, previously Guthrie) on 22 June 1939
Countess Oleg Cassini Loiewski (née Gene Eliza Tierney) on 1 June 1941
Princess Vladimir Eristavi-Tchitcherine (née Lucy Cotton, previously Magraw) on 15 June 1941
Josephine Molyneux, Countess of Sefton (née Josephine Armstrong, previously Gwynne) on 9 December 1941
Princess Serge Troubetzkoy (née Dorothy Livingston Ulrich) on 25 December 1941
Princess Serge Gagarin (née Frances "Patty" Wickham Moore) on 22 September 1942
Oona Chaplin, Lady Chaplin [1975] (née Oona O'Neill) on 16 June 1943
Princess Serge Belosselsky-Belozersky (née Florence Crane, previously Robinson) on 27 October 1943
Kathleen Cavendish, Marchioness of Hartington (née Kathleen Agnes "Kick" Kennedy) on 6 May 1944
Princess Johannes von Liechtenstein (née Jean Ann French) on 27 August 1945
Aimee Corsini dei Principi Corsini, Marquise di Lajatico (née Aimee Gaillard Russell) on 26 November 1945
Carolyn de Crussol, Duchess d'Uzès (née Carolyn Baily Brown) on 18 July 1946
Susan Russell, Viscountess Amberley (née Susan Doniphan Lindsay) on 28 August 1946
Princess Dominik Rainer Radziwiłł (née Lida Lacey Bloodgood) on 8 January 1947
Doña María Aline Griffith Dexter de Figueroa Perez de Guzmán el Bueno, Countess de Quintanilla and Countess de Romanones (née Aline Griffith) on 26 June 1947
Countess Rodolfo Crespi (née Consuelo Pauline O'Brien O'Connor) on 22 January 1948
Countess Bernard d'Harcourt (née Zina Rachevsky) on 4 November 1948 
Caroline Benn, Viscountess Stansgate (née Caroline Middleton DeCamp) on 17 June 1949
Princess Ivan Obolensky (née Claire Elizabeth McGinnis) on 10 October 1949
Princess Ferdinand von Liechtenstein (née Dorothy Haydel, previously Oelrichs) on 21 August 1950
Countess Édouard Decazes de Glücksbierg (née Caroline Triplett Taliaferro Scott) on 4 November 1950
Princess Alexander zu Hohenlohe-Waldenburg-Schillingsfürst (née Patricia Anne "Honeychile" Wilder, previously Cernadas) on 21 May 1951
Princess Edmond Poniatowski (née Anne "Frances" "Nancy" Darwin Goodrich) on 1 May 1952
Virginia Ogilvy, Countess of Airlie (née Virginia Fortune Ryan) on 23 October 1952
Princess Alexis Obolensky (née Katherine Taylor "Kappy" Pearce, previously Gennett) on 22 November 1952
Edith Russell, Countess Russell (née Edith Finch) on 15 December 1952
Baroness Robert Silvercruys (née Rosemary Turner, previously McMahon) on 28 September 1953
Baroness Philippe de Rothschild (née Pauline Fairfax Potter, previously Leser) on 8 April 1954
Countess Albrecht von Bismarck-Schönhausen (née Mona Travis Strader, aka Mona Bismarck, previously Williams) on 5 January 1955
The Princess of Monaco (née Grace Patricia Kelly) on 19 April 1956
Princess Alfred von Auersperg (née Martha Sharp Crawford, aka "Sunny" von Bülow) on 20 July 1957
The Hon. Mrs Anthony George Lowther (née Lavinia Joyce) on 22 July 1958
Nobile Catherine Cordero dei Marchesi di Montezemolo (née Catherine Bradley Murray) in 1958
Princess Stanisław Albrecht Radziwiłł (née Caroline Lee Bouvier, previously Canfield) on 19 March 1959
Princess Charles d'Arenberg (née Margaret Wright "Peggy" Bedford, previously Bancroft) on 29 December 1960, then Duchess d'Uzès on 12 July 1968
Princess Andrew Romanov (née Kathleen Norris, previously Roberts) on 21 March 1961
Countess Guy-Philippe Lannes de Montebello (née Edith Bradford Myles) on 24 June 1961
Countess Friedrich Karl von Schönborn-Buchheim (née Edith Carpenter Macy) on 30 July 1961
Nancy Keith, Lady Keith (née Mary Raye Gross, aka  Nancy "Slim" Keith, previously Hayward) in 1962
Nancy Lowther, Countess of Lonsdale (née Nancy Ruth Cobbs, previously Stephenson) on 6 March 1963

After 1965
No hereditary peerages have been created in the UK since Baron Margadale on 1 January 1965.

Lady Charles Spencer-Churchill (née Gillian Spreckels Fuller) on 30 July 1965
Mary Harmsworth, Viscountess Rothermere (née Mary Murchison, previously Ohrstrom) on 28 March 1966
Countess Jean-François de Chambrun (née Josalee Douglas) on 3 May 1966
Amanda Borghese, Princess di Sant'Angelo e di San Polo and Duchess di Bomarzo (née Amanda Lewis, aka Amanda Leigh) in July 1966
Countess Augusto Gregorini di Savignano di Romagna (née Barbara Goldbach, aka Barbara Bach) in 1966, later Barbara Starkey, Lady Starkey on 27 April 1981
Baroness Otto von Hoffmann (née Barbara Kingsbury, aka Barbara Carrera) in 1966
Marina Berry, Viscountess Camrose (née Marina Beatrice Sulzberger) on 4 January 1967
Princess Charles of Luxembourg (née Joan Douglas Dillon, previously Moseley) on 1 March 1967, later Joan de Noailles, Duchess of Mouchy on 3 August 1978
Eliza Moore, Viscountess Moore (née Eliza Winn Lloyd) on 15 May 1968
Elizabeth Montagu, Duchess of Manchester (née Elizabeth Fullerton, previously Crocker) on 7 February 1969
Linda McCartney, Lady McCartney [1997] (née Linda Louise Eastman, previously See) on 12 March 1969
Pamela Ormsby-Gore, Baroness Harlech (née Pamela Colin) on 11 December 1969
Baroness Donald von Wiedenmann (née Ellen Naomi Cohen, aka Cass Elliot, previously Hendricks) on 12 July 1971
Countess Edmond de La Haye Jousselin (née Anne Guestier Manice) on 28 October 1972
Dorothy Weir, Viscountess Weir (née Dorothy Dear, previously Hutton) on 3 March 1973
Victoria de Rothschild, Lady de Rothschild (née Victoria Lou Schott) on 1 July 1973
Catherine de Castelbajac, Marquise de Castelbajac (née Katherine "Catherine" "Kate" Lee Chambers) on 5 April 1979
Countess Thierry de Ganay (née Frances Akin Spence) on 14 July 1981
Baroness Arnaud de Rosnay (née Jenna Severson) on 12 September 1981, later Countess Emmanuel de Buretel de Chassey on 29 August 1993
Mary Eccles, Viscountess Eccles (née Mary Morley Crapo, previously Hyde) on 26 September 1984
Frau Martin von Haselberg (née Bette Midler) on 16 December 1984
Jamie Haden-Guest, Baroness Haden-Guest (née Jamie Lee Curtis) on 18 December 1984
Monica Neumann von Héthárs, Frau von Héthárs (née Monica Ann Ford, aka Baroness Monica von Neumann) in 1985
Diane Thatcher, Lady Thatcher [1990] (née Diane Burgdorf) on 14 February 1987
Countess Carl-Eduard von Bismarck-Schönhausen (née Laura Elena Martínez Herring, aka Laura Harring) on 27 February 1987
Countess Anton-Wolfgang von Faber-Castell (née Mary Elizabeth Hogan) on 12 December 1987
Princess Andrew Romanov (née Inez Bachelin, previously Storer) on 17 December 1987
Countess Géza von Habsburg (née Elizabeth Jane Kunstadter) on 4 January 1992
Countess Alexandre de Lesseps (née LuAnn Nadeau) on 16 March 1993
Countess Patrick Houitte de La Chesnais (née Stefanie Zofya Paul, aka Stefanie Powers, previously Lockwood) on 1 April 1993
Princess Julie of Nassau (née Julia "Julie" Elizabeth Houston Ongaro) on 29 January 1994
Princess Alexander-Georg Auersperg (née Nancy Louise Weinberg) on 10 June 1995
Marie-Chantal, Crown Princess of Greece (née Marie-Chantal Claire Miller) on 1 July 1995
Princess Alexander von Fürstenberg (née Alexandra Natasha Miller) on 28 October 1995

Fictional American heiresses
Alexis Colby, Fallon Carrington Colby, Amanda Carrington, Krystle Carrington, and Dominique Deveraux in the TV series Dynasty
Pamela "Pam" Barnes Ewing, April Stevens Ewing, Ann Ewing, Sue Ellen Ewing, Valene Ewing, and Lucy Ewing in the TV series Dallas
Constance Weldon Carlyle in the primetime TV soap opera Flamingo Road
Angela Channing in the primetime TV soap opera Falcon Crest
Sue Ellen Mischke in the sitcom Seinfeld
Mary Beth in the TV series Desperate Housewives
Stephanie Forrester, Pamela Douglas, Felicia Forrester, Stephanie "Steffy" Forrester, Phoebe Forrester, Brooke Logan, Taylor Hayes, Darla Forrester, Caroline Spencer, and Caroline Spencer Forrester in the TV soap opera The Bold and the Beautiful
Mackenzie Browning, Gloria Abbott Bardwell, Jill Foster Abbott, Victoria Newman, Cassie Newman, Abby Newman, Summer Newman, Colleen Carlton, Faith Newman, Ashley Abbott, Katherine "Katie" Newman, and Katherine Chancellor in the TV soap opera The Young and the Restless
Victoria Lord, Meredith Lord, Tina Lord, Megan Gordon, Jessica Buchanan, Natalie Buchanan, Sarah Roberts, Starr Manning, Dorian Lord, Blair Cramer, Kelly Cramer, Adriana Cramer, Cassie Callison, and Langston Wilde in the TV soap opera One Life to Live
Claire Meade and Alexis Meade in the American dramedy series Ugly Betty
Cora Crawley, Countess of Grantham in the British period drama TV series Downton Abbey
London Tipton in the American sitcom The Suite Life of Zack & Cody

See also
Born Rich, 2003 documentary created by Jamie Johnson
The Duke's Children, 1879 novel by Anthony Trollope
The Golden Bowl, 1904 novel by Henry James

Footnotes

References

Sources
Paul Theroff's Online Gotha
California Digital Newspaper Collection
D. C. O'Driscoll
The Heirs of Europe
Almanach de Gotha
Burke's Peerage
Debrett's Peerage and Baronetage
Society at Home and Abroad

Further reading
 Depew, Chauncey M. Titled Americans: A List of American Ladies who Have Married Foreigners of Rank. New York (1890)
MacColl, Gail and Wallace, Carol McD. To Marry an English Lord: Tales of Wealth and Marriage, Sex and Snobbery in the Gilded Age. Workman Publishing Company (2012)

Heiresses
American heiresses
Peerage
American upper class